Lisa Johansson may refer to:

Lisa Johansson (singer), member of Swedish Gothic doom/death metal band Draconian
Lisa Johansson (ice hockey) (born 1992), Swedish ice hockey player
Lisa Johansson-Pape (1907–1989), Finnish designer
Lina Johansson (born 1988), Swedish figure skater